Diva Destruction is an American goth rock project. It was formed by singer-songwriter Debra Fogarty in 1998.  Diva Destruction signed to German music label Alice In... of the Dark Dimensions label group. Diva Destruction is also signed to Metropolis Records in North America.

Line-up
Current members
 Debra Fogarty - vocals, lyrics, songwriting, keyboards, drum programming, and production on all albums (from 1998 until present)

Past members
 Benn Ra  - guitars, programming and production on Exposing the Sickness (from 2000 until 2003)
 Sharon Blackstone - backup vocals on Exposing the Sickness and live performances (from 2000 until 2003)
 Jimmy Cleveland - drums (live performances and a song on Exposing the Sickness) (from 2000 until 2004)
 Anthem  - drumkit (live performances and recording of Exposing the Sickness) (from 2001 until 2003)
 Severina Sol - vocals, lyrics (from 1999 until 2000)

Discography
Albums
 2000: Passion's Price
 2003: Exposing the Sickness
 2006: Run Cold

Tracks appearing on compilations
Unquiet Grave 2000 – The Broken Ones
Der Seelen Tiefengrund 3 · Music for Candlelight & Redwine – Hate You To Love You
Unquiet Grave III: Unearthing the Ground – Enslaved
Zillo Romantic Sounds 3 – Lover's Chamber
Orkus Compilation IV – Tempter
Sonic Seducer Cold Hands Seduction Vol. 63 – Rewriting History
Anyone Can Play Radiohead - Climbing Up The Walls
A Gothic Tribute To The Cocteau Twins - Persephone

References

External links
 Official website

Rock music groups from California
American gothic rock groups
Musical groups from Los Angeles
Musical groups established in 1998
Metropolis Records artists